Yamaji (written: 山路 lit. "mountain road", 山地 lit. "mountain ground" or やまじ in hiragana) is a Japanese surname. Notable people with the surname include:

, Japanese manga artist
, Japanese actor and voice actor
Mika Yamaji (born 1978), Japanese film director
, Japanese general
, Japanese softball player
, Japanese footballer
, Japanese footballer
, Japanese serial killer

See also
Yamatji, a Western Australian Aboriginal people, also spelt Yamaji 

Japanese-language surnames